Junaid Sheikh (born 31 July 1984) is an Indian actor and an international model. Since 2010, Junaid has starred in many commercially successful films in Tamil, Telugu, and Malayalam as an Antagonist.

His athletic and muscular physique has made him a natural choice for villainous roles.  Juniad's acting talent completely justifies the critical responsibility. He easily looks every bit a standard Bollywood bad guy with a character, intriguing and engaging the film fans quite easily.

Early life and education

Junaid was born in Jammu, India. He attended Presentation Convent High School at Jammu. He graduated with a degree in Information Technology from Manipal University. After that, he obtained a Masters Degree in Business Administration(MBA) in International Business from Arizona.

Career

Modeling
 He started as an international model and later walked the runway for designers of International repute. South India's leading fashion designer Hari Anand being one among them.
 Show stopper for Sharad and Soniya in 2011 in Pune Fashion week
 Show stopper for Hari Anand in 2013 in Kerala International Fashion week
 Show stopper for Hari Anand in Citadel Fashion Fiesta 2014.
 Fashion Icon for Kerala Fashion League, held on 27 May 2015.

Acting
He began to focus afresh on building a career in the film industry, which led to his joining Mumbai's Barry John's Acting Studio. His first assignment came in the role of a villain in Telugu film Mr. Intelligent, in 2010. 

Over the next five years, Juniad has done over ten movies in Telugu, Malayalam, and Tamil. He came in contact with illustrious film personalities and had the opportunity of working with people like Mahesh Babu, Vijay, Jayaram, Suresh Gopi,  B. Unni Krishnan, Joshiy, and  Mohanlal.

In 2015, he signed for a Hollywood project. Producers are Shravan Kumar and Anirup Sharma under the American banner "Sky Innovation". The director of the movie is Sai Kumar Yadav.

Television

Filmography

References

External links
 
 
 Love to do negative roles: Junaid
 Junaid Shaikh to sizzle in Salaam Kashmir
 http://archive.indianexpress.com/news/all-glitz/785525/
 http://archives.deccanchronicle.com/130811/entertainment-mollywood/article/glad-be-bad
 http://www.bharatstudent.com/news/4-125583/junaid-shaikh-all-set-to-rock-in-salaam-kashmir
http://www.alllightsmedia.in/index.php/filmosphere/gossip-gossip/popular/417-the-dashing-dare-devil-from-the-north-is-all-set-to-rock-the-south
 http://mollybuzzofficial.blogspot.in/2013/09/actor-junaid-shaikh-gallery.html
 http://junaidsheikh.me

1984 births
Living people
Indian male film actors
Male actors in Telugu cinema
Male actors in Malayalam cinema
People from Jammu
Male actors from Jammu and Kashmir
21st-century Indian male actors